An armoured spearhead (American English: armored spearhead) is a formation of armoured fighting vehicles, mostly tanks, that form the front of an offensive thrust during a battle. The idea is to concentrate as much firepower into a small front as possible, so any defenders in front of them will be overwhelmed. As the spearhead moves forward, infantry units following in the gap behind them form up on either side of the line of advance in order to protect the flanks.

The tactic is quite risky. A determined enemy can counterattack against the infantry on the flanks, thereby cutting off the spearhead from resupply and quickly bringing it to a halt. In order to avoid this the spearhead must move as fast as possible in order to keep the defense from re-organizing in this fashion .

The first use of an armored spearhead was during World War II in the 1940 Battle of France, the German Army's invasion of the Low Countries, against the British and French armies . Surprising them out of the Ardennes forest where the Allies believed no armored force could operate, the German spearhead quickly started running for the coast at Dunkirk. The French and British armies were split on either side of the German forces, and at one point attempted to cut the line with an armored attack on either side. The resulting Battle of Arras was very close to an Allied success, but a lack of radios or other communications made the attack slow .

Only a few years later new tactics had been developed to effectively counter the armored spearhead. By attacking with small units just at the "corners" of the spearhead, a defender could maneuver the corner armored units to avoid combat instead of slowing down to engage. By repeating this maneuver a defender can narrow the front of the spearhead until it no longer commands enough width for the following infantry to effectively move. When the Germans tried the same tactic again in 1944 during the Battle of the Bulge, the U.S. Army was able to very quickly "pick the corners" in this fashion and brought the spearhead to a halt in a few days. The tactics of German Blitzkrieg breakthrough was to spearhead the attack with massed Armour-sometimes a whole Panzer division of 240 tanks moving in "combat echelon"-but intimately supported by mechanized artillery and infantry formations.

See also
Flying wedge

References

Tactical formations
Armoured warfare